The men's 1000 metres race of the 2014–15 ISU Speed Skating World Cup 1, arranged in the Meiji Hokkaido-Tokachi Oval, in Obihiro, Japan, was held on 15 November 2014.

Pavel Kulizhnikov of Russia won, followed by Kjeld Nuis of the Netherlands in second place, and Samuel Schwarz of Germany in third place. Yang Fan of China won Division B.

Results
The race took place on Saturday, 15 November, with Division B scheduled in the morning session, at 13:07, and Division A scheduled in the afternoon session, at 15:30.

Division A

Division B

References

Men 1000
1